GSP Atlas is a four-legged jack-up rig, cantilever type with self-elevating unit operated by Grup Servicii Petroliere.

Description
GSP Atlas drilling rig was designed by Sonnat Offshore and was built in the Galaţi Shipyard in 1987. The rig was upgraded in 2007.  

As a drilling rig, GSP Atlas is equipped with advanced drilling equipment and has to meet strict levels of certification under international law. GSP Atlas is able to maneuver with its own engines (to counter drift and ocean currents), but for long-distance relocation it must be moved by specialist tugboats.

References

1987 ships
Jack-up rigs
Ships built in Romania